The 2004 Dutch Figure Skating Championships took place between 2 and 4 January 2004 in Groningen. Skaters competed in the disciplines of ladies' singles and ice dancing.

Senior results

Ladies

Ice dancing

External links
 results

Dutch Figure Skating Championships
2004 in figure skating
2004 in Dutch sport
Sports competitions in Groningen (city)